Ravenscraig railway station was a railway station located south west of the town of Greenock, Inverclyde, Scotland, originally as part of the Greenock and Wemyss Bay Railway and later owned by the Caledonian Railway. 

It was renamed Ravenscraig Hospital when it came under NHS control in 1948. This was four years after the station closed, therefore the name of the station and that of the hospital are not directly connected.

History 
The station opened on 15 May 1865 and closed permanently on 1 February 1944.

Gallery

References 

 Butt, R.V.J. (1995). The Directory of Railway Stations, Patrick Stephens Ltd, Sparkford.

Disused railway stations in Greenock
Former Caledonian Railway stations
Railway stations in Great Britain opened in 1865
Railway stations in Great Britain closed in 1944